Dorcadion kharpuensis is a species of beetle in the family Cerambycidae. It was described by Mikhail Leontievich Danilevsky in 1998. It is known from Iran.

References

kharpuensis
Beetles described in 1998